FC Monolit Moscow was a Russian football team from Moscow. It played professionally from 1994 to 1998. Their best result was 21st place in the Russian Second Division zone West in 1998.

Team name history
 1993–1994 FC Rossiya Moscow
 1995–1999 FC Monolit Moscow

External links
  Team history at KLISF

Association football clubs established in 1993
Association football clubs disestablished in 2000
Defunct football clubs in Moscow
1993 establishments in Russia
2000 disestablishments in Russia